Four-time defending champion Rafael Nadal defeated Novak Djokovic in the final, 3–6, 7–5, 6–2, 6–4 to win the men's singles tennis title at the 2014 French Open. It was his record-extending ninth French Open title and his 14th major title overall, tying Pete Sampras in second place for the most men's singles major titles in history. Nadal became the first man to win nine titles at the same major and the first man to win the French Open five consecutive times.

Roger Federer was trying to become the first man in the Open Era to achieve a double career Grand Slam, but he lost to Ernests Gulbis in the fourth round. This marked Federer's first loss prior to the quarterfinals at the French Open since 2004.

Nadal and Djokovic were in contention for the world No. 1 ranking. Nadal retained the top position by defeating Djokovic in the final. This was the sixth time the duo met at the French Open, with Nadal claiming all six wins thus far.

This was the last major tournament for former world No. 3 and 2009 ATP World Tour Finals champion Nikolay Davydenko and for 2005 US Open semifinalist Robby Ginepri.

Seeds

  Rafael Nadal (champion)
  Novak Djokovic (final)
  Stan Wawrinka (first round)
  Roger Federer (fourth round)
  David Ferrer (quarterfinals)
  Tomáš Berdych (quarterfinals)
  Andy Murray (semifinals)
  Milos Raonic (quarterfinals)
  Kei Nishikori (first round)
  John Isner (fourth round)
  Grigor Dimitrov (first round)
  Richard Gasquet (third round)
  Jo-Wilfried Tsonga (fourth round)
  Fabio Fognini (third round)
  Mikhail Youzhny (second round)
  Tommy Haas (first round, retired because of a right shoulder injury)

  Tommy Robredo (third round)
  Ernests Gulbis (semifinals)
  Kevin Anderson (fourth round)
  Alexandr Dolgopolov (second round)
  Nicolás Almagro (first round, retired because of a left foot injury)
  Jerzy Janowicz (third round)
  Gaël Monfils (quarterfinals)
  Fernando Verdasco (fourth round)
  Marin Čilić (third round)
  Feliciano López (second round)
  Roberto Bautista Agut (third round)
  Philipp Kohlschreiber (third round)
  Gilles Simon (third round)
  Vasek Pospisil (first round)
  Dmitry Tursunov (third round)
  Andreas Seppi (third round)

Qualifying

Draw

Finals

Top half

Section 1

Section 2

Section 3

Section 4

Bottom half

Section 5

Section 6

Section 7

Section 8

References

External links
Official Roland Garros 2014 Men's Singles Draw
 Main Draw
2014 French Open – Men's draws and results at the International Tennis Federation

Men's Singles
French Open by year – Men's singles
French Open – Men's Singles